(German for "New Reading of Marx") or NML is a revival and interpretation of Karl Marx's critique of political economy, which originated during the mid-1960s in both Western and Eastern Europe and opposed both Marxist–Leninist and social democratic interpretations of Marx.  covers a loose group of authors primarily from German-speaking countries who reject certain historicizing and empiricist interpretations of Marx's analysis of economic forms, many of which are argued to spring from Friedrich Engels role in the early Marxist workers' movement.

Overview 
The school of thought is influenced especially the work of the early Soviet thinkers Evgeny Pashukanis and Isaak Illich Rubin, as well as the critical theory of Theodor Adorno. The works of Helmut Reichelt and Hans-Georg Backhaus in the 1970s and 1980s, and the writings of Michael Heinrich in the 1990s, produced at the turn of the millennium a partly academic, partly off-academic debate concerning the question of value. These authors depart in a number of respects from the traditional reading of Marx related to the workers' movement, the bourgeois state and state socialism.

The  rejects
Pre-monetary theories of value, according to which already the single concrete work creates value, and the essence of value is a direct outcome of the invested time of labour. NML instead emphasizes the social character of work creating value.
Conceptions of the state as a manipulative instrument of a ruling class. Instead, the Staatsableitungsdebatte (state derivation debate) has an understanding of the state as a structurally necessary, but relatively separated part of capitalism.
Determinist theories of history which lead to the anticipation of a revolution to be accomplished by the proletariat. In opposition to this idea, capital is considered as an "automatic subject", which exists in a sham as well in a real form.

Thus, the authors of the  contrast themselves from the dominant neoclassical school of economics and maintain the relevance of Marx's approach. In particular, they insist that the microeconomic approaches of the neoclassic theory of economy can't explain the constitution, maintenance and dynamics of the economic value-relations, and can only exhibit insufficient theoretical means when it comes to macro-economic constructs such as e.g. the gross national income. They claim that Marx, although unable to answer these questions, nevertheless provides a higher degree of reflection and awareness of the problems, which has to be recovered in a critical manner for the contemporary discussion.

Bibliography 
Helmut Reichelt,  [On the logical structure of the concept of capital according to Marx]. Dissertation of 10 July 1968, Faculty of Economics and Social Science, Universität Frankfurt am Main, 1968, p. 265; fourth revised edition, with a preface by Iring Fetscher, Frankfurt am Main: Europäische Verlagsanstalt, 1973 (Politische Ökonomie); Freiburg im Breisgau: Ça Ira, 2001, .
;  [The economics of value] (dissertation) VSA-Verlag, 1991; second, revised edition: Westfälisches Dampfboot, 2003
Hans-Georg Backhaus:  [Dialectic of value: investigations of Marxist economic criticism], Freiburg im Breisgau 1997, .
Helmut Reichelt,  [New reading of Marx: On critique of social-scientific logic], Hamburg 2008, .

See also 
 Critique of political economy
 Monetary theory of value
 Neo-Marxism
 Western Marxism

Further reading

English 
Jacques Bidet: New Interpretations of Capital, in : Jacques Bides, Stathis Kouvelakis: Critical Companion to Contemporary Marxism, BRILL 2008,  (Historical materialism book series 16), pp. 369–384
 Ingo Elbe: Between Marx, Marxism and Marxisms. Ways of Reading Marx's Theory
 Sotiropoulos, Dimitris P., Milios J. Political economy of contemporary capitalism and its crisis: demystifying finance. Routledge, 2015. 
 Heinrich, Michael, and Alexander Locascio. An Introduction to the Three Volumes of Karl Marx's Capital. Monthly Review P, 2012.

German 
Ingo Elbe: Marx im Westen. Die neue Marx-Lektüre in der Bundesrepublik seit 1965, Berlin 2008, 
sample, table of contents and introduction (33 pages pdf)
Hendrik Wallat: Theoriegeschichte der neuen Marx-Lektüre, review of Marx im Westen (10 pages pdf)
Michael Heinrich: Wie das Marxsche Kapital lesen?, Schmetterling Verlag, 1st edition 2008
Michael Heinrich: "Die Wissenschaft vom Wert: Die Marxsche Kritik der politischen Ökonomie zwischen wissenschaftlicher Revolution und klassischer Tradition" 
Michael Heinrich:Kritik der politischen Ökonomie - Eine Einführung, Schmetterling Verlag, 3rd edition 2005
 Hanno Pahl: Das Geld in der modernen Wirtschaft. Marx und Luhmann im Vergleich, Frankfurt 2008, 
 Jan Hoff, Alexis Petrioli, Ingo Stützle, Frieder Otto Wolf (Hrsg.): Das Kapital neu lesen. Beiträge zur radikalen Philosophie, Westfälisches Dampfboot, Münster 2006, 
 sample with table of contents, introduction and epilog (34 pages pdf)
 Wolfgang Fritz Haug: Die »Neue Kapital-Lektüre« der monetären Werttheorie, review of Das Kapital neu Lesen (15 pages pdf)
 Lars Meyer: Absoluter Wert und allgemeiner Wille. Zur Selbstbegründung dialektischer Gesellschaftstheorie, Bielefeld 2005, .
 Joachim Hirsch:Der Staat der Bürgerlichen Gesellschaft: Zum Staatsverständnis von Karl Marx, Frankfurt 2008, 
 Christine Kirchhoff, Hanno Pahl, Christoph Engemann, Judith Heckel, Lars Meyer (Hg.): Gesellschaft als Verkehrung. Perspektiven einer neuen Marx-Lektüre. Festschrift für Helmut Reichelt, Freiburg 2004, .
 Jan Hoff: Kritik der klassischen politischen Ökonomie. Zur Rezeption der werttheoretischen Ansätze ökonomischer Klassiker durch Karl Marx, Cologne 2004, .
 Dieter Wolf: Kritische Theorie und Kritik der politischen Ökonomie. Eine kritische Auseinandersetzung mit Schriften von Hans-Georg Backhaus und Helmut Reichelt. In: Dieter Wolf, Heinz Paragenings: Zur Konfusion des Wertbegriffs. Beiträge zur „Kapital“-Diskussion, Argument Verlag, Hamburg 2004,  (Berliner Verein zur Förderung der MEGA-Edition e.V., Wissenschaftliche Mitteilungen Heft 3)
 Dieter Wolf: Zur Methode in Marx’ „Kapital“ unter besonderer Berücksichtigung ihres logisch-systematischen Charakters. Zum Methodenstreit zwischen Wolfgang Fritz Haug und Michael Heinrich. In: Ingo Elbe, Tobias Reichardt, Dieter Wolf: Gesellschaftliche Praxis und ihre wissenschaftliche Darstellung. Beiträge zur Kapital-Diskussion. Wissenschaftliche Mitteilungen. Heft 6. Argument Verlag, Hamburg, 2008.  Hrsg.: Carl-Erich Vollgraf, Richard Sperl & Rolf Hecker.

External links 
Ingo Elbe: Zwischen Marx, Marxismus und Marxismen – Lesarten der Marxschen Theorie (pdf)
 GegenStandpunkt: Wie man „Das Kapital“ nicht schon wieder neu lesen sollte. Zur „Einführung in die Kritik der politischen Ökonomie“ von Michael Heinrich (pdf), GegenStandpunkt – Politische Vierteljahreszeits chrift 2/2008.
 Dieter Wolf:Die Wertform und die dialektische Methode. Zur Deutung der Dialektik der Wertform durch Hans-Georg Backhaus In: Der dialektische Widerspruch im Kapital" Ein Beitrag zur Marxschen Werttheorie. Hamburg, 2002, S. 151ff.

Eponymous economic ideologies
Marxist schools of thought